Panheel is a village in the Dutch province of Limburg. It is a part of the municipality of Maasgouw, and lies about 9 km south-west of Roermond.

The village was first mentioned in 1417 or 1418 as Panhedel. The etymology is unclear.

Panheel was home to 175 people in 1840. In 1875, a chapel was built. Panheel was never elevated to a parish, however it is considered a village by the municipality.

The Boschmolenplas is a lake which formed as a result of gravel excavation. It is therefore, a popular diving spot.

Gallery

References

Populated places in Limburg (Netherlands)
Maasgouw